Andamukkam City bus stand, Kollam, is one of the two bus stands in the city of Kollam in the Indian state of Kerala. Situated in the Downtown Kollam area, it is also known as Andamukkam private bus stand. The bus stand is only for private city buses and Kerala State Road Transport Corporation (KSRTC) ordinary bus services running to Chinnakada. It is the starting point of various city bus services connecting Chinnakada to Mayyanad, Elampalloor, Sakthikulangara, Chavara, Thoppilkadavu, Prakkulam, Kottiyam, Perumon and Kadavoor. KSRTC have plans to start an operations centre at the bus station.

History
Kollam's city bus stand was originally in Chinnakada until in 2006, Kollam Municipal Corporation took the decision to build an underpass on the former site. The bus station was subsequently moved to Andamukkam in 2008, following a decision by the District Traffic Advisory Committee.

Private/government institutions near Andamukkam bus stand
 Kerala Public Service Commission District Office
 Hotel Naani
 Corporation building, Andamukkam
 Corporation building, Chinnakada
 Quilon Co-operative Urban Bank

References

Bus stations in Kollam